Alain André Christian Perrin (born 7 October 1956) is a French professional football manager and former player.

Perrin made his managerial breakthrough at Troyes, whom he took from the fourth tier to Ligue 1 and UEFA Cup qualification by winning the 2001 UEFA Intertoto Cup. He won the Coupe de France with Sochaux in 2007, and the league and cup double for Lyon a year later.

Abroad, Perrin worked for several years in Qatar and had brief spells in the United Arab Emirates and with Portsmouth in the Premier League. Internationally, he led China at the 2015 AFC Asian Cup.

Early life
Alain André Christian Perrin was born on 7 October 1956 in Lure, Haute-Saône.

Managerial career

Troyes
Perrin began his coaching career at Nancy in 1983, as junior coach to Arsène Wenger. He built up a reputation as a talented young coach whilst at the club, and was appointed to run the club's academy.

In 1993, Perrin had his first chance at management, taking over as manager of French National 2 (fourth division) club Troyes AC, quickly taking the club to Ligue 1 after three promotions in six seasons, and qualifying for the UEFA Cup. His side won the 2001 UEFA Intertoto Cup on the away goals rule after a 4–4 draw at Newcastle United.

Marseille
In May 2002, Perrin signed a three-year deal to succeed Bernard Tapie as manager of Olympique de Marseille. He was dismissed in January 2004 with the team in sixth, having lost 9 of their last 15 games.

Days after leaving the Stade Vélodrome, Perrin was linked to a number of managerial positions around Europe, including at Premier League club Southampton. However, in July 2004 he was named manager of Al-Ain in the UAE Pro League, and remained there for three months.

Portsmouth
On 7 April 2005, Perrin did move to the Premier League when he took over at Portsmouth; the club were in 16th place and four points above relegation with seven games to go. On 24 April his side beat rivals Southampton 4–1 in the South Coast derby, a result that contributed to Pompey staying up and Saints being relegated. 

On 24 November 2005 Perrin was sacked by Portsmouth, having won only twice all season.

Return to France
Perrin returned to Ligue 1 in May 2006, taking over a Sochaux side that had just finished 15th under Dominique Bijotat. On 12 May 2007 he won the Coupe de France against former team Marseille, on penalties after a 2–2 draw; it was the team's first win in the tournament since 1937.

Perrin took over as manager of Olympique Lyonnais on 30 May 2007, after Gérard Houllier resigned earlier that month. In his only season, he led the club to a seventh consecutive Ligue 1 championship title, and retained the cup for the team's first double. He stepped down in June 2008 due to differences with the club's backroom staff.

He was rumoured to take over the position of French national manager, but it was confirmed on 3 July 2008 that Raymond Domenech would remain in the position. On 11 November 2008, he became the new manager of Saint-Étienne, and was fired on 15 December 2009.

Qatar
On 1 June 2012, Perrin decided to leave Al-Khor Sports Club to take up the vacant Qatar U23 position. His first assignment was to lead the team at the AFC Under-22 qualifiers, however the team were unable to make the tournament after they were knocked out in the group stages of the qualification process. Despite this disappointment Perrin continued to lead them into the 2012 Under 23 Gulf Cup of Nations where the team fared considerably better reaching the semi-finals of the tournament and eventually coming fourth overall in the competition.

On 20 December 2012, Perrin joined Al Gharafa and left just about two months after. In March 2013, he was appointed new head coach of Umm Salal to replace Bertrand Marchand. He resigned from his post on 30 September 2013 after losing twice in the first three games of the season.

China
On 28 February 2014, Perrin was named as new China national football team manager, replacing Antonio Camacho. He made his debut five days later in a 3–1 loss to Iraq in the last game of 2015 AFC Asian Cup qualification, but still made it through as the best third-placed team. At the finals in Australia, the team won all three group games before a 2–0 last 16 loss to the hosts.

In August, China finished second to South Korea on home soil at the 2015 EAFF East Asian Cup. The following 8 January, he left his job as the team sat in third in 2018 FIFA World Cup qualification following a loss at Qatar and two draws with Hong Kong.

Nancy
In April 2018 Perrin was one of 77 applicants for the vacant Cameroon national team job. On 27 October that year, he replaced Didier Tholot as manager of Ligue 2 club Nancy. On 28 May 2019, it was confirmed that Jean-Louis Garcia would be the new manager of the club from the upcoming season.

Managerial statistics

Honours

Troyes
UEFA Intertoto Cup: 2001

Sochaux
Coupe de France: 2006–07

Lyon
Ligue 1: 2007–08
Coupe de France: 2007–08
Trophée des Champions: 2007

References

External links

Alain Perrin – Association of Football Statistics

1956 births
Living people
People from Lure, Haute-Saône
Sportspeople from Haute-Saône
French footballers
Association football defenders
AS Nancy Lorraine players
French football managers
ES Troyes AC managers
Olympique de Marseille managers
Portsmouth F.C. managers
FC Sochaux-Montbéliard managers
Olympique Lyonnais managers
Premier League managers
AS Saint-Étienne managers
Al Ain FC managers
Umm Salal SC managers
China national football team managers
AS Nancy Lorraine managers
Ligue 1 managers
2015 AFC Asian Cup managers
Expatriate football managers in the United Arab Emirates
Expatriate football managers in England
Expatriate football managers in Qatar
Expatriate football managers in China
French expatriate sportspeople in the United Arab Emirates
French expatriate sportspeople in England
French expatriate sportspeople in Qatar
French expatriate sportspeople in China
Footballers from Bourgogne-Franche-Comté